The Liga MX Femenil, officially known as the Liga BBVA MX Femenil for sponsorship reasons, is the highest division of women's football in Mexico. Supervised by the Mexican Football Federation, this professional league has 18 teams, each coinciding with a Liga MX club. Following the same schedule as the men's league, each season has two halves: an Apertura tournament, which takes place from July to December, and a Clausura tournament, which takes place from January to May. The league's first official domestic cup competition took place in May 2017 via the Copa MX Femenil, a now discontinued tournament that was created with the objective of preparing the teams for the inaugural season of the league which began in July 2017. Former Liga MX President, Enrique Bonilla, stated that the league was created in order to nurture the stars of the Mexico women's national football team and to build an infrastructure for women's football in Mexico.

Tigres UANL has won the league a record five times, followed by C.D. Guadalajara and Monterrey with two titles each. In all, only four teams have won the Liga MX Femenil title since the league's first inaugural tournament back in 2017.

The current champions are Tigres UANL who defeated Club América with a 3–0 aggregate score in the Apertura 2022 final in November 2022.

History

Liga Mexicana de Fútbol Femenil
In 2007, there was an attempt to professionalize women's football in Mexico via the Liga Mexicana de Fútbol Femenil. While the league did foster some success, particularly when Mexico's national team beat the United States for the first time in 2010, it did not have major sponsorship and lacked media coverage. Therefore, major clubs, such as Chivas, pulled their support.

NWSL
In 2012, the United States Soccer Federation, Canadian Soccer Association, Mexican Football Federation, USL W-League, and the Women's Premier Soccer League agreed to form the National Women's Soccer League. From 2013 to 2016, the Mexican Football Federation allocated Mexican players to NWSL clubs in an effort to build Mexican talent in the United States. However, in early 2016, the Mexican Football Federation announced that it would no longer continue allocating players to the NWSL due to the lack of playing time that the allocated players were receiving, foreshadowing the creation of Liga MX Femenil.

First Professional Women’s Team 
Marbella Ibarra was an enthusiastic women's football advocate that persuade Club Tijuana to create a professional women's team in 2014. Andrea Rodebaugh, former Mexico women's national football team player and former Mexico under-20 women's national football team manager, as well as current sporting director of the Mexico women's national football teams program, took the helm as manager during the program's stint in the Women's Premier Soccer League.

A New Mexican League

Announcement and preparation 
In December 2016, during a general assembly meeting with all Liga MX club owners, former Liga MX President, Enrique Bonilla, announced the formation of the new Liga MX Femenil In an effort to grow and build talent within Mexico.  The announcement stated that 16 out of the 18 Liga MX clubs (excluding Puebla and Chiapas due to financial problems) would field U-23 rosters with four U-17 players and up to two overage players.

Before the inaugural season, the teams participated in a preparation tournamentnt called Copa MX Femenil. The tournament took place between 3 May and 6 May 2017, with only 12 of the 16 teams participating due to four clubs not having a team ready by the time of the tournament inauguration. Pachuca won this tournament by winning the final 9–1 against Club Tijuana.

First season
The first Apertura 2017 matches were played on 28 July 2017. Chivas won the first Liga MX Femenil championship on 24 November 2017 by defeating Pachuca in the final. The two matches drew record-setting crowds of 28,955 and 32,466 spectators, respectively.

Commentator Glenn Moore declared the Liga MX Femenil to have concluded a "very successful debut campaign."<ref>Moore, Glenn (Dec 29, 2017), "Kansas Move to Utah", World Soccer Magazine.</ref>

Regulations
During the inaugural season, teams were expected to field U-23 rosters; four slots were reserved for U-17 players, while two were for overage players. All players had to be born in Mexico. Additionally, the sixteen teams were split into two groups. Teams in each group played each other twice per season. The top two teams from each group advanced to the playoffs, which was a semifinal of two matches (home and away) followed by a final, also of two matches.

After the first season, the rules mostly stayed the same. However, the U-23 limit was raised to U-24. As for the playoffs, they were expanded to eight teams. The top four teams from each group moved on to the liguilla, with the top team from one group playing the fourth ranked team from the other in the quarterfinals.

For the third season, the age limit was raised to 25, but each team was allowed to field up to 6 overage players at a time. In addition, the groups were undone, so each team would play each other at least once during the season. Foreign-born Mexican players were also allowed to play, with up to six allowed per team. This decision brought in more players from the NCAA as well as from the NWSL and Spain's Primera División.

For the fourth season, the overage limit was removed, nonetheless the teams are still being required to allocate minutes to U-20 players. The Campeón de Campeones championship was also introduced to the league for the first time, with Tigres winning the first edition automatically by winning the league title of both Guardianes 2020 and Guardianes 2021 tournaments respectively. 

For the fifth season, the league began to allow each team to have two international non-Mexican players on their roster. On 25 June 2021, Tigres became the first club to make use of this option by signing Brazilian player Stefany Ferrer. The league also began its inaugural U-17 division; Club América won the initial tournament.

Beginning with the sixth season, the league implemented VAR in the playoffs phase of the tournament. International players spots also increased from 2 to 4 per team.

Notable Results
The league set history during the Clausura 2018 tournament as the second match of the final between Monterrey and Tigres at Estadio BBVA was at the time the highest-attended club match in women's football history, with a total of 51,211 fans attending the match. This record has been broken multiple times since then, but Mexico still holds the record for the highest attendance on a women's football match, which took place during the 1971 Women's World Cup final at Estadio Azteca.

On 5 October 2019, Liga MX Femenil and the NWSL hosted their first ever international friendly match when Tigres faced Houston Dash at the Estadio Universitario. Tigres won the match 2–1.

On 5 July 2022, a Liga MX Femenil team and a European team faced each other for the first time when Club América played against German team Bayer 04 Leverkusen at Estadio Azteca. The match ended in a 1–0 victory for América.

In November 2022, the league's previous highest attendance record set during the Clausura 2018 final between Monterrey and Tigres (51,211 attendees) was broken as the first match of the Apertura 2022 final between Tigres and Club América at Estadio Azteca was attended by 52,654 fans.  This final also broke viewership records as it was watched by more than 5.3 million people, therefore becoming the most-watched Liga MX Femenil final in history. The second match of this final was also the most-watched women's football match in history in North America. As a whole, the Apertura 2022 tournament became the most attended and watched tournament in Liga MX Femenil history.

The league's biggest transfer transaction in history occurred during the Clausura 2023 tournament when Tigres accepted to transfer Nigerian forward Uchenna Kanu to NWSL club Racing Louisville for a $150,000 fee plus  incentives. This was also the biggest transfer transaction in history between the NWSL and Liga MX Femenil.

 Club Changes 
During the inaugural season, only 16 out of the 18 Liga MX teams had a Liga MX Femenil team as Chiapas and Puebla were allowed to not have a team due to their financial struggles. However, by the second season, all 18 teams had an active Liga MX Femenil team. By then, Chiapas had been relegated to Ascenso MX, while Lobos BUAP had been promoted to Liga MX. As such, Lobos BUAP and Puebla both introduced their Liga MX Femenil teams during the 2018–2019 season.

By the third season, the league was expanded to 19 teams as Atlético San Luis Femenil was introduced due to Atlético San Luis being promoted to Liga MX while no team was relegated. Additionally, the Lobos BUAP franchise was acquired by then-second division club FC Juárez, as such the Lobos BUAP femenil team moved from Puebla to Juárez to form FC Juárez Femenil. After the Apertura 2019, Veracruz folded in Liga MX, as such Veracruz Femenil was now a defunct club as well, bringing the league back down to 18 teams.

Sponsorships
Prior to the third season, BBVA México announced that it would sponsor the Liga MX Femenil in addition to Liga MX and Ascenso MX. With the sponsorship, which is slated for at least three years, the league's name was changed to Liga BBVA MX Femenil in June 2019. Each club also has sponsors for their jerseys, salaries, TV rights, and other factors.

Lower Divisions
In addition to the Liga Mexicana de Fútbol Femenil, which facilitates the SuperLiga and the segunda división, Mexico is also home to the Liga Mayor Femenil. Most players in the Liga MX Femenil previously played in either of these existing leagues, as well as in various Mexican or US college teams and the WPSL.

Teams
The following 18 clubs will compete in the Liga MX Femenil during the 2022–23 season.

Competition format

 Regular Phase 
For the inaugural 2017–18 season, the regular phase competition format consisted of 16 teams divided into two groups of 8 from which the top two teams from each group at the end of the regular phase qualified for the semi-finals of the “liguilla” (Liga MX Femenil version of the playoffs).  For the 2018–19 season, the regular phase format was changed along with the addition of two more teams to the league. With the new format, 18 teams were divided into two groups of 9, from which the top four teams from each group at the end of the regular phase of the tournament qualified for the quarter-finals of the liguilla.  For the 2019–20 season, the format was once more changed and the current regular phase format was implemented. The current format consists of a single table of 18 teams, in which each team plays against the other 17 teams. After 17 match days, The top eight teams advance to the quarter-finals of the liguilla.

 Playoffs (liguilla) Phase 
The liguilla (Spanish for "little league") is the playoff phase of the tournament. This phase begins with the quarter-finals, for which the top eight teams at the end of the regular phase qualify. Each stage of the liguilla'' is play as a two-game series (home-and-away basis), in which the team that finished higher in the table in the regular phase always plays the second match at home. In case of draw in the aggregate score of a series in the quarter-finals or semi-finals stage, the team that finished higher in the table in the regular phase of the tournament will advance to the next stage. In case of draw in the aggregate score of the final, the teams will go directly to penalties to decide the champion.

Promotion and Relegation 
Liga MX Femenil currently does not have a Promotion and relegation system.

Champions

Titles per club

Media coverage

 (*) All match times are Mexico City Time UTC−06:00 in January – Saturday before 1st Sunday in April and last Sunday in October – December; UTC-05:00 from 1st Sunday in April – Saturday before last Sunday in October.

Attendance
The attendance for the first regular season for the 16 teams was 307,202 for 112 matches, an average of 2,743 per match.  The attendance for the 6 post-season matches was 104,804.  The total attendance for 118 matches was 412,006, an average of 3,492 per match.

The league has set various attendance records for women's club soccer. The Tigres vs. Monterrey final in May 2018 saw over 51,000 attendees; this occupied the top spot in the world for nearly a year. Prior to this match, Mexico's other finals and rivalry games had also set new records or made it into the top 10 attendance records.

In November 2022, the league's previous highest attendance record set during the Clausura 2018 final between Monterrey and Tigres (51,211 attendees) was broken as the first match of the Apertura 2022 final between Tigres and Club América at Estadio Azteca was attended by 52,654 fans.

Managers
The current managers in the Liga MX Femenil are:

Top scorers

References

External links

 
1
Women's association football leagues in North America
Women's football in Mexico
Sports leagues established in 2016
2016 establishments in Mexico
Professional sports leagues in Mexico